Hasanabad (also Romanized as Ḩasanābād; also known as Ḩasanābād-e Qahāb and Ḩoseynābād-e Qohāb) is a village in Qahab-e Jonubi Rural District, in the Central District of Isfahan County, Isfahan Province, Iran. At the 2006 census, its population was 600, in 146 families.

References 

Populated places in Isfahan County